Klára Křížová (13 July 1989) is a female alpine skier from the Czech Republic. She took part in the alpine skiing events at the 2010 Winter Olympics. She also competed in the FIS Alpine World Ski Championships 2009.

Křížová opened the women's downhill in the 2010 Winter Olympics, but suffered a crash, in which she lost a ski pole, following this she was able to finish in 37, placing her as the slowest person to successfully complete the course at 2:09:27. In the women's super-G, she came 29 out of 38 successful finishes.

Results
FIS Alpine World Ski Championships 2009:Super-G–25Super combined–252010 Winter Olympics: Downhill–37Super-G–29

References

External links

 Klára Křížová at www.vancouver2010.com

1989 births
Czech female alpine skiers
Alpine skiers at the 2010 Winter Olympics
Alpine skiers at the 2014 Winter Olympics
Olympic alpine skiers of the Czech Republic
Living people